Puri (sometimes spelled as poori) is a deep-fried bread made from unleavened whole-wheat flour that originated in the Indian subcontinent. It is eaten for breakfast or as a snack or light meal. It is usually served with a savory curry or bhaji, as in puri bhaji, but may also be eaten with sweet dishes.

Puris are most commonly served as breakfast and snacks. It is also served at special or ceremonial functions as part of ceremonial rituals along with other vegetarian food offered in Hindu prayer as prasadam.

Name 
The name puri derives from the Sanskrit word पूरिका (pūrikā), from पुर (pura) "filled". In other South Asian languages it is known as: Urdu: پوری (𝘱𝘰𝘰𝘳𝘪), Dogri: पूरी (pūrī) or पूड़ी (pūṛī), Kumaoni: लगड (lagaḍ),      (boori),  (pūri), Gujarati: પૂરી,  (puri),  (pūri),  (pūṛī),  (pūṛī),  (pūrī),   (pūri),  (pūrī),  (pūrī),  (puri),  (puri),  (pūṛī), Garhwali: पूरी (pūrī),

Ingredients 
Puris are prepared with wheat flour, either atta (whole wheat flour) or sooji (coarse wheat flour). In some recipes, ajwain, cumin seed, spinach, or fenugreek seeds are added to the dough. The dough is either rolled out in a small circle or rolled out and cut out in small circles, then deep fried in ghee or vegetable oil.  While deep frying, puris puff up like a round ball because moisture in the dough changes into steam which expands in all directions. When they are golden-brown in color, they are removed and either served hot or saved for later use (as with the snack food pani puri). Rolled puris may be pricked with a fork before deep frying to make flat puris for chaat like bhel puri. A punctured puri does not puff when cooked because the steam escapes as it cooks.

Accompaniments 

Puri can be eaten with many savory accompaniments, including korma, chana masala, dal, potato-based curries (for example, saagu, bhaji, bhujia, Aloo ki tarkari, shaak, and sambharo), shrikhand and basundi. In some parts of India, puri is also served with a mixed vegetable dish that is prepared during Hindu Puja. Puri is also eaten with sweet accompaniments, such as kheer (a dessert prepared with rice, milk and sugar) or halwa (in Hindi-speaking regions of India, the expression "Halwa puri khana", "to eat puri with halwa", signifies a celebration – of possibly modest means). Puri is often the bread of choice for festivals and special occasions.

In southern India, puri is almost always made for breakfast, and on the east coast (Andhra, Tamil Nadu) it's rarely eaten with non-vegetarian dishes. Often, they will be served with pickles, chutneys, dal masalas, potato masala, or gourd curry (either ivy, ridge, or bottle varieties).

Types, variants 
A variant of puri is bhatoora, which is three times the size of a puri and served with chholey (spicy chick peas). It often constitutes a full meal. (See chole bhature). Bhatoora bread is with yeast and puri bread made from unleavened dough.

In the Indian state of Odisha a large size puri is made during Bali Yatra which is called thunka puri.

Another variant, largely popular in the Northern Indian state of Uttar Pradesh is bedvi. It is a saltier and stiffer version of the regular puri, and is often stuffed with lentils.

Another variant of the puri popular in the eastern states of West Bengal and Odisha is the luchi. In Assam, it is pronounced as lusi. Luchis in Bengal are served with typical side dishes like aloor dum (potato preparation), begun bhaja (fried eggplant) and others

The puris used for panipuri are smaller, and are usually made crisper by the addition of rava/sooji (semolina) to the dough.

Sev puri is an Indian snack offered by street vendors who serve chaat.

Street vendors in Mumbai serve bhel in a throw-away folded leaf with a flat puri to scoop it.

Fast food chains in the Middle East use puri for fried chicken wraps.

See also 

 List of Indian breads
 List of Pakistani breads
 Kulcha
 Khachapuri
 Shelpek

References

External links 

Indian fast food
Indian breads
Punjabi cuisine
Sindhi cuisine
Muhajir cuisine
Pakistani fast food
Pakistani breads
Uttar Pradeshi cuisine
Flatbreads
Unleavened breads
Kerala cuisine
Tamil cuisine
Odia cuisine
Bengali cuisine
Nepalese cuisine
Sri Lankan cuisine
Telangana cuisine
Andhra cuisine
Karnataka cuisine
Malaysian breads
Gujarati cuisine
Deep fried foods
Bangladeshi cuisine
Burmese cuisine
Indian cuisine
Pakistani cuisine
Indo-Caribbean cuisine
Guyanese cuisine